Henry Earl Pearcy Sr. (July 21, 1922 – January 11, 2002) was an American professional basketball player. He played in 29 games for the Detroit Falcons of the Basketball Association of America in the 1946–47 season. He recorded 73 points, 7 assists, and 20 personal fouls in his career. Henry is the younger brother of George Pearcy, who also played for the Falcons that season.

BAA career statistics

Regular season

References

External links

1922 births
2002 deaths
American men's basketball players
Basketball players from Indiana
Detroit Falcons (basketball) players
Guards (basketball)
Indiana State Sycamores men's basketball players
People from Martinsville, Indiana
United States Army Air Forces pilots of World War II